Wolfgang P. Schleich (born 23 February 1957, in Mühldorf am Inn, Germany) is professor of theoretical physics and director of the quantum physics department at the University of Ulm.

Education, work and career
From 1980 to 1984, Wolfgang Schleich performed work on his diploma thesis and his Ph.D. with Marlan O. Scully at the Ludwig Maximilian University of Munich, with an intermediate research visit at the Institute of Modern Optics, Albuquerque, from 1982 to 1983. After completion of his Ph.D., he performed post-doctorate research with John Archibald Wheeler at the Center for Theoretical Physics in Austin, Texas, USA.

From 1986 to 1991, he worked as research scientist at the Max Planck Institute of Quantum Optics in Garching under Herbert Walther. In 1991, Schleich was nominated professor of theoretical physics at the University of Ulm. He is editor of the journal Optics Communications. He is author of several books, including Quantum Optics in Phase Space and Elements of quantum information.

His areas of research include the foundations of quantum physics, as well as quantum mechanics in relation to general relativity and to number theory. His recent work includes elaborations on the role of the Wigner function in terms of quantum optics.

Awards
 1983: Otto Hahn Medal
 1991: Physics Award of the Deutsche Physikalische Gesellschaft
 1993: Ernst Abbe Medal
 1995: Gottfried Wilhelm Leibniz Prize
 2002: Max Planck Research Award
 2007: First Class Medal of the Czech Technical University in Prague
 2008: Willis E. Lamb Award for Laser Science and Quantum Optics 
 2008: Distinguished Professor at the University of North Texas
 2021: Herbert Walther Award

Publications
 
 
 
 Wolfgang Schleich: Optische Tests der allgemeinen Relativitätstheorie, Universität München (Ph.D. thesis) / Max-Planck-Institut für Quantenoptik, 1984
 Wolfgang Schleich: Quantenfluktuationen in Ringlaser-Gyroskopen, Max-Planck-Institut für Quantenoptik (Diplom thesis), 1981

References

External links
 Schleich, Wolfgang P., Institut für Quantenphysik, Universität Ulm
 Prof. Dr. Wolfgang P. Schleich, Integrated Quantum Systems and Technology
 Prof. Dr. Wolfgang Schleich, Universität Ulm

1957 births
21st-century German physicists
Living people
University of North Texas faculty
20th-century German physicists